Caesar Augustus Rodney (January 4, 1772 – June 10, 1824) was an American lawyer and politician from Wilmington, in New Castle County, Delaware. He was a member of the Democratic-Republican Party, who served in the Delaware General Assembly, as well as a U.S. Representative from Delaware, U.S. Senator from Delaware, U.S. Attorney General, and U.S. Minister to Argentina.

Early life and family

Rodney was born in Dover in the Delaware Colony, son of Thomas Rodney and Elizabeth Fisher. He was the nephew of Caesar Rodney, the signer of the Declaration of Independence who is depicted on the Delaware state quarter. After graduating from the University of Pennsylvania in 1789, he studied law under Joseph B. McKean in Philadelphia and was admitted to the bar in 1793. He practiced law in Wilmington and New Castle, Delaware, for the next three years. Rodney married Susan Hunn, the daughter of Captain John Hunn, and their home was "Cool Springs", located in Wilmington.

Professional and political career
Rodney served six terms as State Representative, from the 1797 session through the 1802 session. There he became one of the leaders of the Jeffersonian party, now known as the Democratic-Republican Party. Encouraged by Jefferson to compete for the U.S. House against the staunch Federalist James A. Bayard, Rodney ran and won a lively campaign by fifteen votes. While in the U.S. House, he was a member of the Committee on Ways and Means, and established a national reputation as one of the managers appointed in January 1804 to prepare the articles of impeachment against John Pickering, judge of the United States District Court for New Hampshire. Pickering was charged with conduct unbecoming a judge, and his acquittal was viewed as strengthening the independence of the judiciary.  In December of the same year, Rodney led another such case against Samuel Chase, Associate Justice of the Supreme Court of the United States.

After serving one term in the U.S. House from March 4, 1803, until March 3, 1805, he was defeated for reelection in 1804 by Bayard, by nearly as close a vote. The two men, always vigorous political opponents, remained good friends throughout their tumultuous political careers.

While Rodney spent most of his legal career in public service, he took on at least one notable case as a private advocate during the year before his appointment as Attorney General.  In 1806, he made an appearance before the Mayor's Court of Philadelphia to defend the Philadelphia Cordwainers against a common law charge of conspiracy.  The conspiracy charge was instituted by retail shoe merchants, based on attempts by the journeyman shoe and boot makers, to organize for the purpose of setting their wages and hours.  Rodney was unsuccessful in attaining an acquittal for the workers.

Attorney general

On January 20, 1807, U.S. President Thomas Jefferson named Rodney his U.S. Attorney General. He served in that office for the remainder of Jefferson's term and for nearly three years in President James Madison's first term.  As Attorney General, Rodney participated as a member of the prosecution during the second treason trial of former Vice-President Aaron Burr. Rodney resigned December 5, 1811, unhappy about being passed over for a U.S. Supreme Court appointment. During the War of 1812, he was captain of a rifle corps which became the Delaware 1st Artillery. They served at Fort Union in Wilmington, on the Canadian frontier, and assisted in the defense of Baltimore in 1814.

Later political activity
Rodney returned to politics, serving in the Delaware State Senate for three sessions from 1815 through 1817. In 1820 he was again elected to the U.S. House, serving from March 4, 1821, until January 24, 1822, when he resigned upon being elected to the U.S. Senate. He served there only a year as well, resigning January 29, 1823, to accept a diplomatic appointment. During that brief year Rodney was Delaware's only Democratic-Republican U.S. Senator ever.

Along with John Graham and Theodorick Bland, Rodney was selected by President James Monroe in 1817 for a special diplomatic mission to South America, the South American Commission of 1817–1818. Rodney was appointed to lead the commission to investigate whether the newly formed South American republics should be recognized. He strongly advocated such recognition and, with Graham, published his findings in 1819 as Reports on the Present State of the United Provinces of South America. This report is thought to have contributed much to the thinking behind the policy that eventually became expressed as the Monroe Doctrine. It also resulted in Rodney's 1823 appointment as United States Minister Plenipotentiary to the United Provinces of the Río de la Plata, now known as Argentina. He remained at this posting until his death.

Death and legacy
Rodney died June 10, 1824, in Buenos Aires, and was buried there in the Victoria district British Cemetery. His remains were moved to a crypt at St. John's Cathedral in Buenos Aires. The crypt is at the peristyle of the entrance of the cathedral.

Almanac
Elections were held the first Tuesday of October. Members of the General Assembly took office on the first Tuesday of January. State Representatives were elected for one year. U.S. Representatives took office March 4 and have a two-year term. The General Assembly chose the U.S. Senators, who also took office March 4, but for a six-year term. In this case the General Assembly failed to fill the position for nearly a year.

Notes

References

Commonwealth v. Pullis ("The Philadelphia Cordwainers' Case"), Mayor's Court of Philadelphia (1806)

External links
Biographical Directory of the United States Congress
Delaware's Members of Congress

The Political Graveyard

Places with more information
Delaware Historical Society; website; 505 North Market Street, Wilmington, Delaware 19801; (302) 655-7161
University of Delaware; Library website; 181 South College Avenue, Newark, Delaware 19717; (302) 831–2965

1772 births
1824 deaths
People from Dover, Delaware
People of colonial Delaware
American people of English descent
United States Attorneys General
Jefferson administration cabinet members
Madison administration cabinet members
Democratic-Republican Party members of the United States House of Representatives from Delaware
Democratic-Republican Party United States senators from Delaware
Ambassadors of the United States to Argentina
Members of the Delaware House of Representatives
People from Wilmington, Delaware
19th-century American politicians
19th-century American diplomats
Delaware lawyers
University of Pennsylvania alumni
American military personnel of the War of 1812
Burials in Argentina
Rodney family of Delaware